Rifaat "Jimmy" Turk (born 16 September 1954) is a retired Arab-Israeli footballer, manager, and a former Deputy Mayor of Tel Aviv. Turk was the first Arab to play for the Israel national team and to represent the country at the Olympic Games.

Biography

Football career
Born in Jaffa, Turk was the son of a fisherman and dropped out of school during the eighth grade. After being spotted by a scout in 1970 at the age of 16, he joined Hapoel Tel Aviv's youth team, and made his debut for the club in 1972.

The following year he made his debut for the Israel national team, and also became the first Arab to represent Israel at the Olympic games when he played in the football tournament of the 1976 Summer Olympics. Turk was subjected to anti-Arab abuse during nearly every game he played. In 1980, he was named Israel's player of the year.

After leaving Hapoel Tel Aviv in 1984, Turk signed for Hapoel Jerusalem. He retired from playing in 1987, and went on to manage several clubs, including Hapoel Tayibe, the first Arab club to play in the top division.

On 7 July 2015 replaced Nissan Yehezkel as Maccabi Ahi Nazareth's manager. On 13 January 2016, he was fired from his job.

Honours
Israeli Championships (1):
1980–81

Political career
Turk is a member of Meretz and was elected to the Tel Aviv-Yafo Municipality in 1998. In 2003, he was elected the city's deputy mayor.

Personal life
Turk's son Hanes is part of Hapoel Tel Aviv's youth system.

References

External links
 The Association for Sports, Culture and Education in Jaffa

1954 births
Living people
Israeli Muslims
Israeli footballers
Arab politicians in Israel
Hapoel Tel Aviv F.C. players
Hapoel Jerusalem F.C. players
Israel international footballers
Olympic footballers of Israel
Maccabi Ahi Nazareth F.C. managers
Footballers at the 1976 Summer Olympics
Arab-Israeli footballers
Meretz politicians
Footballers from Jaffa
Deputy Mayors of Tel Aviv-Yafo
Association football midfielders
Israeli football managers
Israeli people of Turkish descent
Israeli Football Hall of Fame inductees